Patrick Duigenan, PC (I) KC, FTCD (1735–11 April 1816), Irish lawyer and politician, was the son of a Leitrim Catholic farmer surnamed Ó Duibhgeannáin.

Through the tuition of the local Protestant clergyman, who was interested in the boy, he got a scholarship in 1756 at Trinity College, Dublin, and subsequently became a fellow. At some point he joined the Anglican faith. He studied law at the Middle Temple, was called to the Irish bar in 1767  and obtained a rich practice, mainly in the area of law relating to tithes. At that time tithes were levied from the majority Roman Catholic population for the benefit of the minority Church of Ireland, and were consequently unpopular. In spite of his Anglican convictions, he provided his Catholic wife with a chapel at their home and arranged for a priest to say Mass for her on Sundays. He opposed the Maynooth Grant and was appointed Grand Secretary of the Orange Order in 1801.

He is remembered, however, mainly as a politician, on account of his opposition to Grattan, his support of the Union, and his violent antagonism to Catholic emancipation, both in the Irish House of Commons and in pamphlets. As a Member of Parliament (MP), he represented Old Leighlin one of the Bishop’s boroughs of the Irish Parliament between 1791 and 1798 and subsequently Armagh Borough until 1801. He sat then for Armagh City in the first Parliament of the United Kingdom. He was a member of the Privy Counsel of Ireland from 1808 and a well-known character at Westminster until he died on 11 April 1816.

He had married twice; firstly around 1782, to Angelina, daughter of Thomas Berry of Eglish Castle, King's County, and secondly, on 2 October 1807, Hester Watson, the widow of George Heppenstall, solicitor to the Dublin police, of Sandymount. He had no children by either marriage.

See also

Clan O Duibhgeannain

Notes

References

1735 births
1816 deaths
19th-century Irish people
British King's Counsel
Irish Queen's Counsel
Converts to Anglicanism from Roman Catholicism
Irish MPs 1790–1797
Irish MPs 1798–1800
Members of the Parliament of the United Kingdom for County Armagh constituencies (1801–1922)
Politicians from County Dublin
Politicians from County Leitrim
UK MPs 1801–1802
UK MPs 1802–1806
UK MPs 1806–1807
UK MPs 1807–1812
UK MPs 1812–1818
Members of the Privy Council of Ireland
Members of the Parliament of Ireland (pre-1801) for County Carlow constituencies
Members of the Parliament of Ireland (pre-1801) for County Armagh constituencies